John M. Keenan  (January 1, 1869 – December 21, 1909), or Kid Keenan, was an American major league baseball pitcher. He pitched one game for the Cincinnati Kelly's Killers of the American Association on August 11, 1891. It would be a 9–3 loss to the Boston Reds at East End Park. While he was signed to play for Cincinnati, and went on the road to St. Louis with them, the team was disbanded before he could play in any other games. After his brief Major League appearance, he pitched from 1893 to 1899 in the minor leagues.

References

 Baseball-reference
 Society for Cincinnati Sports Research | August 11th 1891

1869 births
1909 deaths
Major League Baseball pitchers
Cincinnati Kelly's Killers players
19th-century baseball players
Baseball players from Louisville, Kentucky
Chattanooga Warriors players
Atlanta Atlantas players
Richmond Crows players
Mobile Bluebirds players
Toledo Mud Hens players
Schenectady Electricians players
Nashville Tigers players